Khan Muhammad Wala is a union council in the Punjab province of Pakistan.

Khan Muhammad Wala village is situated on the road joining Bhera with Bhalwal. It is 8 km away from Bhera and 15 km from Bhalwal. It lies on the bank of Shahpur canal.

The majority of the people are farmers who grow mostly sugarcane, wheat, rice, and tobacco. Major cast is Gondal as the Gondal clan settled in this village.

Education
The education rate of this village is more than 60%. People of this village are keen to get education. Khan Muhammad Wala has one government high school for boys and one high school for girls. Many students go to colleges for their studies situated at Bhera and Bhalwal, Sargodha and Islamabad. Sradar Khan s/o Rehmat khan sharfana is the first person to become a civil engineer with distinction to top the Rasool Technical College in late sixties. His son Munawar Sajjad Gondal followed him and became first civil servant at federal level. 

One of the most popular technical education computer centers known is EURO Computers, established in 2005 and still working with computer education. Many other private schools such as Qiadat Primary School and Pakistan Science Academy are also playing major role for the primary education of the beginners.

References

External links
Euro Computers

Populated places in Sargodha District